is a passenger railway station located in  Sakai-ku, Sakai, Osaka Prefecture, Japan, operated by the private railway operator Nankai Electric Railway. It has the station number "NK55".

Lines

Layout
The station consists of two opposed side platforms with an elevated station building.

Platforms

Barrier‐free construction 
Until 2010, a building believed to be the old above-ground station building remained under the bridge station building near Koyasan on platform 2, but it was removed during the barrier-free construction in 2011. In the past, the overall difference between the platform and the train was large and it was dangerous to get on and off, but this problem was resolved by the implementation of the lifting work. At that time, the line display, clock, and station name sign were changed to new models. In the past, the bridge station building itself did not have barrier-free facilities, and dedicated passages and intercoms for wheelchair users were installed on both the upper and lower platforms (the up platform is near the aforementioned building, the down platform is near the bicycle parking lot), but with the completion of the barrier-free construction in 2011, an elevator was installed. In addition, toilets were relocated and gender-segregated and multipurpose toilets were installed.

Adjacent stations

History
Asakayama Station opened on June 22, 1915.

Passenger statistics
In fiscal 2019, the station was used by an average of 8681 passengers daily.

Surrounding area
 Kansai University Sakai Campus 
 Sakai Women's Junior College
 Kaorigaoka Liberte High School
 Asakayama General Hospital

See also
 List of railway stations in Japan

References

External links

  

Railway stations in Japan opened in 1915
Railway stations in Osaka Prefecture
Sakai, Osaka